National Cycle Network (NCN) Route 67 is a Sustrans National Route that runs from Long Whatton to Northallerton.

History
Many sections of the route are Railway Paths including ex Great Central Railway Five Pits Trail and ex North Eastern Railway Nidderdale Greenway.

Route
The route is incomplete with gaps to the planned northern and southern trailheads and there are gaps south of Chesterfield. Between Leeds and Bramham the gap is filled by NCN Route 66.

Long Eaton to Heanor
The southern end of route 67 is at junction with NCN Route 6 in Long Eaton.

Blackwell to Grassmoor
There is a gap for approximately  before NCN 67 restarts at Blackwell.

Chesterfield to Leeds

The longest continuous section of NCN 67 is the  Trans Pennine Trail (Central) route from Chesterfield to Leeds. It passes through the eastern sides of Sheffield, Barnsley and Wakefield.

Bramham to Ripon

From Bramham the route uses paths adjacent to the A1(M) to Wetherby where it uses the Harland Way railway path to Spofforth. The route is the a mixture of on-road, traffic free and railway path through Harrogate to its current northern terminus at a junction with NCN Route 688 near Fountains Abbey.

Related NCN routes
Route 67 is part of the Trans Pennine Trail (Central) route along with:

Route 67 meets the following routes:
  at Leeds  and Bramham 
  at Wetherby 
  at Harrogate 
  at Fountains Abbey 
  at Wombwell  and 
  at Meadowhall  and Long Eaton 
  at Sheffield

References

External links

Route 67 on the Sustrans web site
 Trans Pennine Trail official web site

Cycleways in England
National Cycle Routes